Dedrick Harrington (born September 25, 1983) is a former American football linebacker. He was signed by the Dallas Cowboys as an undrafted free agent in 2007. He played college football at Missouri.

Harrington has also been a member of the St. Louis Rams.

External links
Indianapolis Colts bio
Missouri Tigers bio
St. Louis Rams bio

1983 births
Living people
People from Mexico, Missouri
American football linebackers
American football tight ends
Missouri Tigers football players
Dallas Cowboys players
Indianapolis Colts players
St. Louis Rams players